Come, quando, perché, internationally released as How, When and with Whom, is a 1969 Italian romance film written and directed by Antonio Pietrangeli. It is the last film of Pietrangeli, who died drowning in the sea of Gaeta, while he was testing some shots for the next day; he was eventually replaced by Valerio Zurlini.

Plot 
Paola, wife of a wealthy Turinese industrialist, meets Alberto, a friend of her husband, who emigrated to Argentina and has returned for business reasons. After a few days, Alberto confesses his love to Paola, but she resists. However, during a vacation in Sardinia, having waited in vain for the arrival of her husband, she gives in to Alberto's wishes. They continue their relationship back in Turin, but she chooses not to follow him to Argentina.

Cast 
 Philippe Leroy	as 	Marco
 Horst Buchholz	as Alberto
 Danièle Gaubert	as Paola
 Elsa Albani	as 	Marco's mother
 Lilli Lembo	as Lucy
 Colette Descombes
 Liana Orfei

References

External links

1969 films
Italian romance films
1960s romance films
Films directed by Antonio Pietrangeli
Films set in Sardinia
1960s Italian-language films
1960s Italian films